Abakanovo is a rural locality (a village) in Nikolskoye Rural Settlement of Kaduysky District, Russia. The population was 10 as of 2002.

Geography 
Abakanovo is located 43 km north of Kaduy (the district's administrative centre) by road. Seninskaya is the nearest rural locality.

References 

Rural localities in Kaduysky District